Hullavington railway station served the civil parish of Hullavington, Wiltshire, England from 1903 to 1965 on the South Wales Main Line.

History 
The station was opened on 1 July 1903 by the Great Western Railway, on an embankment just west of the Hullavington-Norton road, about half a mile north of Hullavington village. There was a goods yard and a weighbridge. The station closed to passengers on 3 April 1961 and to goods traffic on 4 October 1965.

References

External links 

Disused railway stations in Wiltshire
Former Great Western Railway stations
Railway stations in Great Britain opened in 1903
Railway stations in Great Britain closed in 1961
1903 establishments in England
1965 disestablishments in England